Hilton Hiller Schlosberg (born 1952/1953) is a South African-born British billionaire businessman. He is the vice chairman, president, and chief operating officer (COO) of Monster Beverage since 1990.

Early life

Schlosberg was born in South Africa and was educated at the University of the Witwatersrand in Johannesburg, South Africa

Career
In 1990, a consortium led by Schlosberg and his fellow South African, Rodney Sacks, acquired Hansen Natural Corporation, which in 1992 acquired Hansen’s Natural Soda and Apple Juice for $14.5 million. Since 1990, Schlosberg has been President and COO of Hansen Natural Corporation, which changed its name to Monster Beverage Corporation in 2012.  Schlosberg has been Chief Financial Officer of the Company since July 1996, Member of the Executive Committee since October 1992, and Vice Chairman, Secretary and a Director of MEC from July 1992 to the present.

Personal life
He is married to Michelle Schlosberg.

References

Living people
British billionaires
South African billionaires
1950s births
University of the Witwatersrand alumni